Aglaia rubiginosa is a species of plant in the family Meliaceae. It is found in Indonesia, Malaysia, the Philippines, and Singapore.

References

rubiginosa
Near threatened plants
Taxonomy articles created by Polbot